Family Guy: Uncensored is an iOS game developed and published by Glu Mobile. It was published on September 23, 2009.

Characters
Peter Griffin
Lois Griffin
Brian Griffin
Chris Griffin
Stewie Griffin
Meg Griffin
Glenn Quagmire
Joe Swanson
Mort Goldman
Greased-up Deaf Guy
Herbert
Jesse (Herbert's dog)
Cleveland Brown
Opie
Ernie the Giant Chicken
Evil Monkey
New Brian
Olivia Fuller
Bertram
Ollie Williams

Reception

Family Guy: Uncensored received mixed reviews from critics. Aggregating review website, GameRankings, provides an average rating of 51.00% based on 5 reviews

See also
List of Family Guy video games

References

2009 video games
Android (operating system) games
IOS games
Action video games
Video games developed in the United States
Video games based on Family Guy
Glu Mobile games
Single-player video games